This is list details of 1. FC Nürnberg managers and their statistics, trophies and other records.

Managers, tenure, wins, draws, losses and winning percentage

References

Managers
 
Lists of football managers by club in Germany